Blessings is the third studio album by American rock band Sublime with Rome, released on May 31, 2019 through 5 Music. It is the first album to include former Tribal Seeds drummer Carlos Verdugo following Josh Freese's departure in 2017. The album was recorded at Sonic Ranch in El Paso, Texas and was produced by Rob Cavallo.

"Wicked Heart" was released as the album's first single, reaching No. 34 on Billboard's Alternative Songs chart.

Track listing
Credits adapted from iTunes.

Personnel
 Rome Ramirez – vocals, guitar
 Eric Wilson – bass
 Carlos Verdugo – drums, percussion
 Gabrial McNair - trombone, keyboards
 Eddie Zuko - guest vocals on "One Day At A Time"
 Rob Cavallo - production
 Leigh "LDontheCut" Snyder - Production on "Survive"

References

Sublime with Rome albums
2019 albums
Albums recorded at Sonic Ranch